This is a list of electoral division results for the Australian 1961 federal election.

Overall
This section is an excerpt from 1961 Australian federal election § House of Representatives

New South Wales

Banks 
This section is an excerpt from Electoral results for the Division of Banks § 1961

Barton 
This section is an excerpt from Electoral results for the Division of Barton § 1961

Bennelong 
This section is an excerpt from Electoral results for the Division of Bennelong § 1961

Blaxland 
This section is an excerpt from Electoral results for the Division of Blaxland § 1961

Bradfield 
This section is an excerpt from Electoral results for the Division of Bradfield § 1961

Calare 
This section is an excerpt from Electoral results for the Division of Calare § 1961

Cowper 
This section is an excerpt from Electoral results for the Division of Cowper § 1961

Cunningham 
This section is an excerpt from Electoral results for the Division of Cunningham § 1961

Dalley 
This section is an excerpt from Electoral results for the Division of Dalley § 1961

Darling 
This section is an excerpt from Electoral results for the Division of Darling § 1961

East Sydney 
This section is an excerpt from Electoral results for the Division of East Sydney § 1961

Eden-Monaro 
This section is an excerpt from Electoral results for the Division of Eden-Monaro § 1961

Evans 
This section is an excerpt from Electoral results for the Division of Evans § 1961

Farrer 
This section is an excerpt from Electoral results for the Division of Farrer § 1961

Grayndler 
This section is an excerpt from Electoral results for the Division of Grayndler § 1961

Gwydir 
This section is an excerpt from Electoral results for the Division of Gwydir § 1961

Hughes 
This section is an excerpt from Electoral results for the Division of Hughes § 1961

Hume 
This section is an excerpt from Electoral results for the Division of Hume § 1961

Hunter 
This section is an excerpt from Electoral results for the Division of Hunter § 1961

Kingsford Smith 
This section is an excerpt from Electoral results for the Division of Kingsford Smith § 1961

Lang 
This section is an excerpt from Electoral results for the Division of Lang § 1961

Lawson 
This section is an excerpt from Electoral results for the Division of Lawson § 1961

Lowe 
This section is an excerpt from Electoral results for the Division of Lowe § 1961

Lyne 
This section is an excerpt from Electoral results for the Division of Lyne § 1961

Macarthur 
This section is an excerpt from Electoral results for the Division of Macarthur § 1961

Mackellar 
This section is an excerpt from Electoral results for the Division of Mackellar § 1961

Macquarie 
This section is an excerpt from Electoral results for the Division of Macquarie § 1961

Mitchell 
This section is an excerpt from Electoral results for the Division of Mitchell § 1961

New England 
This section is an excerpt from Electoral results for the Division of New England § 1961

Newcastle 
This section is an excerpt from Electoral results for the Division of Newcastle1961

North Sydney 
This section is an excerpt from Electoral results for the Division of North Sydney § 1961

Parkes 
This section is an excerpt from Electoral results for the Division of Parkes (1901–1969) § 1961

Parramatta 
This section is an excerpt from Electoral results for the Division of Parramatta § 1961

Paterson 
This section is an excerpt from Electoral results for the Division of Paterson § 1961

Phillip 
This section is an excerpt from Electoral results for the Division of Phillip § 1961

Reid
This section is an excerpt from Electoral results for the Division of Reid § 1961

Richmond 
This section is an excerpt from Electoral results for the Division of Richmond § 1961

Riverina 
This section is an excerpt from Electoral results for the Division of Riverina § 1961

Robertson 
This section is an excerpt from Electoral results for the Division of Robertson § 1961

Shortland 
This section is an excerpt from Electoral results for the Division of Shortland § 1961

St George 
This section is an excerpt from Electoral results for the Division of St George § 1961

Warringah 
This section is an excerpt from Electoral results for the Division of Warringah § 1961

Watson 
This section is an excerpt from Electoral results for the Division of Watson (1934–1969) § 1961

Wentworth 
This section is an excerpt from Electoral results for the Division of Wentworth § 1961

Werriwa 
This section is an excerpt from Electoral results for the Division of Werriwa § 1961

West Sydney 
This section is an excerpt from Electoral results for the Division of West Sydney § 1961

Victoria

Balaclava 
This section is an excerpt from Electoral results for the Division of Balaclava § 1961

Ballaarat 
This section is an excerpt from Electoral results for the Division of Ballarat § 1961

Batman 
This section is an excerpt from Electoral results for the Division of Batman § 1961

Bendigo 
This section is an excerpt from Electoral results for the Division of Bendigo § 1961

Bruce 
This section is an excerpt from Electoral results for the Division of Bruce § 1961

Chisholm 
This section is an excerpt from Electoral results for the Division of Chisholm § 1961

Corangamite 
This section is an excerpt from Electoral results for the Division of Corangamite § 1961

Corio 
This section is an excerpt from Electoral results for the Division of Corio § 1961

Darebin 
This section is an excerpt from Electoral results for the Division of Darebin § 1961

Deakin 
This section is an excerpt from Electoral results for the Division of Deakin § 1961

Fawkner 
This section is an excerpt from Electoral results for the Division of Fawkner § 1961

Flinders 
This section is an excerpt from Electoral results for the Division of Flinders § 1961

Gellibrand 
This section is an excerpt from Electoral results for the Division of Gellibrand § 1961

Gippsland 
This section is an excerpt from Electoral results for the Division of Gippsland § 1961

Henty 
This section is an excerpt from Electoral results for the Division of Henty § 1961

Higgins 
This section is an excerpt from Electoral results for the Division of Higgins § 1961

Higinbotham 
This section is an excerpt from Electoral results for the Division of Higinbotham § 1961

Indi 
This section is an excerpt from Electoral results for the Division of Indi § 1961

Isaacs 
This section is an excerpt from Electoral results for the Division of Isaacs (1949–1969) § 1961

Kooyong 
This section is an excerpt from Electoral results for the Division of Kooyong § 1961

La Trobe 
This section is an excerpt from Electoral results for the Division of La Trobe § 1961

Lalor 
This section is an excerpt from Electoral results for the Division of Lalor § 1961

Mallee 
This section is an excerpt from Electoral results for the Division of Mallee § 1961

Maribyrnong 
This section is an excerpt from Electoral results for the Division of Maribyrnong § 1961

McMillan 
This section is an excerpt from Electoral results for the Division of McMillan § 1961

Melbourne 
This section is an excerpt from Electoral results for the Division of Melbourne § 1961

Melbourne Ports 
This section is an excerpt from Electoral results for the Division of Melbourne Ports § 1961

Murray 
This section is an excerpt from Electoral results for the Division of Murray § 1961

Scullin 
This section is an excerpt from Electoral results for the Division of Scullin (1955–69) § 1961

Wannon 
This section is an excerpt from Electoral results for the Division of Wannon § 1961

Wills 
This section is an excerpt from Electoral results for the Division of Wills § 1961

Wimmera 
This section is an excerpt from Electoral results for the Division of Wimmera § 1961

Yarra 
This section is an excerpt from Electoral results for the Division of Yarra § 1961

Queensland

Bowman 
This section is an excerpt from Electoral results for the Division of Bowman § 1961

Brisbane 
This section is an excerpt from Electoral results for the Division of Brisbane § 1961

Capricornia 
This section is an excerpt from Electoral results for the Division of Capricornia § 1961

Darling Downs 
This section is an excerpt from Electoral results for the Division of Darling Downs § 1961

Dawson 
This section is an excerpt from Electoral results for the Division of Dawson § 1961

Fisher 
This section is an excerpt from Electoral results for the Division of Fisher § 1961

Griffith 
This section is an excerpt from Electoral results for the Division of Griffith § 1961

Herbert 
This section is an excerpt from Electoral results for the Division of Herbert § 1961

Kennedy 
This section is an excerpt from Electoral results for the Division of Kennedy § 1961

Leichhardt 
This section is an excerpt from Electoral results for the Division of Leichhardt § 1961

Lilley 
This section is an excerpt from Electoral results for the Division of Lilley § 1961

Maranoa 
This section is an excerpt from Electoral results for the Division of Maranoa § 1961

McPherson 
This section is an excerpt from Electoral results for the Division of McPherson § 1961

Moreton 
This section is an excerpt from Electoral results for the Division of Moreton § 1961

Oxley 
This section is an excerpt from Electoral results for the Division of Oxley § 1961

Petrie 
This section is an excerpt from Electoral results for the Division of Petrie § 1961

Ryan 
This section is an excerpt from Electoral results for the Division of Ryan § 1961

Wide Bay 
This section is an excerpt from Electoral results for the Division of Wide Bay § 1961

South Australia

Adelaide 
This section is an excerpt from Electoral results for the Division of Adelaide § 1961

Angas 
This section is an excerpt from Electoral results for the Division of Angas (1949–1977) § 1949

Barker 
This section is an excerpt from Electoral results for the Division of Barker § 1961

Bonython 
This section is an excerpt from Electoral results for the Division of Bonython § 1961

Boothby 
This section is an excerpt from Electoral results for the Division of Boothby § 1961

Grey 
This section is an excerpt from Electoral results for the Division of Grey § 1961

Hindmarsh 
This section is an excerpt from Electoral results for the Division of Hindmarsh § 1961

Kingston 
This section is an excerpt from Electoral results for the Division of Kingston § 1961

Port Adelaide 
This section is an excerpt from Electoral results for the Division of Port Adelaide § 1961

Sturt 
This section is an excerpt from Electoral results for the Division of Sturt § 1961

Wakefield 
This section is an excerpt from Electoral results for the Division of Wakefield § 1961

Western Australia

Canning 
This section is an excerpt from Electoral results for the Division of Canning § 1961

Curtin 
This section is an excerpt from Electoral results for the Division of Curtin § 1961

Forrest 
This section is an excerpt from Electoral results for the Division of Forrest § 1961

Fremantle 
This section is an excerpt from Electoral results for the Division of Fremantle § 1961

Kalgoorlie 
This section is an excerpt from Electoral results for the Division of Kalgoorlie § 1961

Moore 
This section is an excerpt from Electoral results for the Division of Moore § 1961

Perth 
This section is an excerpt from Electoral results for the Division of Perth § 1961

Stirling 
This section is an excerpt from Electoral results for the Division of Stirling § 1961

Swan 
This section is an excerpt from Electoral results for the Division of Swan § 1961

Tasmania

Bass 
This section is an excerpt from Electoral results for the Division of Bass § 1961

Braddon 
This section is an excerpt from Electoral results for the Division of Braddon § 1961

Denison 
This section is an excerpt from Electoral results for the Division of Denison § 1961

Franklin 
This section is an excerpt from Electoral results for the Division of Franklin § 1961

Wilmot 
This section is an excerpt from Electoral results for the Division of Wilmot § 1961

Territories

Australian Capital Territory 
This section is an excerpt from Electoral results for the Division of Australian Capital Territory § 1961

Northern Territory 
This section is an excerpt from Electoral results for the Division of Northern Territory § 1961

See also 

 Candidates of the 1961 Australian federal election
 Members of the Australian House of Representatives, 1961–1963

References 

House of Representatives 1961